Guardea is a comune (municipality) in the Province of Terni in the Italian region Umbria, located about 60 km south of Perugia and about 30 km west of Terni.

Among the churches is the parish church of Santi Pietro e Cesareo and the churches of Sant'Egidio and Santa Lucia.

Guardea borders the following municipalities: Alviano, Amelia, Avigliano Umbro, Civitella d'Agliano, Montecastrilli, Montecchio.

Twin towns
 Champignelles, France
 Gubbio, Italy

References

External links
 Official website

Cities and towns in Umbria